Defence Island is an island of the Andaman Islands. It belongs to the South Andaman administrative district, part of the Indian union territory of Andaman and Nicobar Islands.

Geography
The island belongs to the Defence Group and lies in the sound of Jirkatang.Defence Island is an island of the Andaman Islands. It belongs to the South Andaman administrative district, part of the Indian union territory of Andaman and Nicobar Islands.[5] The island is 33.5 km (21 mi) north of Port Blair.

Administration
Politically, Defence Island, along neighboring islands, is part of Ferrargunj Taluk.It is governed by Indian Government.

References 

South Andaman district
Tourist attractions in the Andaman and Nicobar Islands
Uninhabited islands of India
Islands of India
Islands of the Bay of Bengal